Popstars is a New Zealand reality documentary television show. The first edition aired on TVNZ in 1999 and showed the establishment of a five-piece girl group, TrueBliss. The series was the origin of the Popstars reality TV series format, which went on to be sold to over 50 countries. A reboot of Popstars screened in 2021, making the New Zealand format the only one remaining in the franchise to keep ongoing to this day.

Format
Unlike the modern Idol or The X Factor television franchises — which are presented as singing contests with public votes — the original 1999 New Zealand series of Popstars was presented as a documentary. It looked at the formation of a modern pop group from the auditions through to the first released single. There was no public vote – the five group members were decided by a panel of music industry experts.

Popstars creator Jonathan Dowling licensed the series concept to production company Screentime in Australia, who then on sold it to TresorTV in Germany before taking it worldwide. The series format was sold to over 50 countries internationally.

First Edition (1999)
The inaugural season of Popstars screened on TVNZ's TV2 channel in 1999 and was made up of nine half-hour episodes. The show's producers received $291,170 in funding from NZ On Air.

The format focused on the development of the five-piece girl group TrueBliss. The group's five members were Joe Cotton, Keri Harper, Erika Takacs, Carly Binding and Megan Alatini. Popstars followed TrueBliss as they recorded singles, music videos, album and embarked on a promotional tour of New Zealand.

The show also featured series creator and producer Jonathan Dowling and musician Peter Urlich.

Second Edition (2021)
In April 2021, TVNZ debuted a 24 episode second season of Popstars. The show format has been revamped. Unlike the original show in 1999, it is not a documentary following the formation of a girl group. Instead, the reboot focuses on individual artists — both solo artists and groups of any gender, aged 16 or older, and places its emphasis on original songwriting from the performers themselves.

The series involves a panel of three experts, headed by Kimbra, who is joined by Nathan King and Vince Harder. In the auditions phase, the singers are first assessed by vocal coaches Bella Kalolo and Jeremy Redmore.

The series screened on TVNZ 2 on Monday, Tuesday, and Wednesday nights. The first episode was also simultaneously screened on TVNZ 1.

In the end, Auckland based singer/songwriter Christabel Williams won and took home the $100,000 prize to continue her musical career.

References

External links
 TrueBliss at Audio Culture
 Popstars at NZ On Screen

Popstars
1999 New Zealand television series debuts
1990s New Zealand television series
2020s New Zealand television series
New Zealand music television series
New Zealand popular music
New Zealand reality television series
Television series by Banijay
Television series revived after cancellation
Television shows funded by NZ on Air
TVNZ 2 original programming